Kowiesy  is a village in Skierniewice County, Łódź Voivodeship, in central Poland. It is the seat of the gmina (administrative district) called Gmina Kowiesy.

The village has an approximate population of 150.

References

Villages in Skierniewice County